A list of films that are based on books about common topics and issues in social science and political science.

Addiction

Alcoholism

India

Mexico

 ♠ The subject is the British consul in a Mexican town (based on Cuernavaca).

United States

Drug addiction

Germany

 ♠ The German book title translates literally as Christiane F. – We Children from the Zoo Station.

United Kingdom

United States

Sex addiction

United States

Civil rights

South Africa

United States
For slave revolts, see List of films based on war books — 1775–1898.

 * TV movie.
 ** TV miniseries.

Journalism
(Print and television)

Reporters

 ♠ A television reporter broadcasts live from the 1746 Battle of Culloden.
 * TV movie.

Editors

Publishers

 ♠ Mrs. Graham is often mentioned but not dramatized.

Labour

Belgium

United States

Agriculture

Manufacturing

 * TV movie.

Mining

Sports

 ♠ The hockey players in the wage dispute are Canadian; the club owners are American.
 * TV movie.

Mental disorder

19th century

Canada

20th century

United States

Native issues

Australia

United States

 ♠ The story of Ira Hayes was also told in Flags of Our Fathers.

Penology

Roman Empire

Brazil

France

South Africa

United Kingdom

 ♠ The earliest editions of the novel did not contain a glossary, or any indication that the slang was based on Russian.

Capital punishment

United States

Capital punishment

 * TV movie.

USSR

Political prisoners

Greece

 ♠ The film concerns torture during the period of the colonels.

South Africa

Poverty

Brazil

United Kingdom

United States

Urban

Rural

References

Notes

Bibliography
Lavington, Stephen. Virgin Film: Oliver Stone, Virgin Books, London, 2004.

See also
List of fiction works made into feature films
List of non-fiction works made into feature films
List of biographical films

Pages with the same format
 List of films based on arts books
 List of films based on crime books
 List of films based on film books
 List of films based on sports books
 List of films based on spy books
 List of films based on war books
 List of films based on westerns

Lists of films based on books
Films set in the 19th century